Richard William Marsh, Baron Marsh,  (14 March 1928 – 29 July 2011) was a British politician and business executive.

Background and early life
Marsh was the son of William Marsh, a foundry worker from Belvedere in southeast London. His father subsequently worked for the Great Western Railway, and the family moved to Swindon.  He was educated at Jennings Street Secondary School, Swindon, Woolwich Polytechnic and Ruskin College, Oxford. He initially worked as an official for the  National Union of Public Employees from 1951 to 1959, during which time he sat on the Clerical and Administrative Whitley Council for the National Health Service.

Parliamentary and ministerial career

After unsuccessfully standing at Hertford in 1951, Marsh
was elected as Labour Party Member of Parliament (MP) for Greenwich at the 1959 general election.

As a backbencher he submitted a private members bill in 1960 which despite Government opposition became the Offices, Shops and Railway Premises Act, a white-collar equivalent of the Factories Act and the forerunner of the Health and Safety at Work Act.

When Labour came to power in 1964 he became a Parliamentary Secretary in the Ministry of Labour and subsequently, in 1965, in the new Ministry of Technology.

Minister of Power

He served in the second Wilson Government as the Minister of Power (1966–68). On 22 April 1966 as Minister of Power he officially opened the new Hinkley Point A nuclear power station. He piloted the legislation for the nationalisation of the steel industry.

Minister of Transport

Subsequently, he served in the Cabinet as Minister of Transport (1968–69). When appointed to the transport ministry he let it be known that (unlike Barbara Castle, his predecessor in the post) he was a motorist, though he insisted that the family car, a Ford Cortina, was run by his wife while he relied on ministerial cars for his transport needs. He was also reported as having taught his father to drive, but having given up trying to perform the same favour for his wife, applying what forty years later appears as imprudent candour in characterising the attempt as "traumatic".

Chairman of British Rail

He left the House of Commons in 1971 to become Chairman of the British Railways Board, a position he held until 1976. On leaving British Rail, he was knighted, and became chairman of the Newspaper Publishers' Association (NPA). The first chairman of the NPA to come from outside of the industry, he served until 1990. He also held the chairmanships of the British Iron and Steel Consumers' Council from 1977 to 1982 and of Allied Investments Ltd from 1977 to 1981. He was also a member of a number of quangoes, held directorships in several private companies and was chairman of TV-am from 1983 to 1984.

Joins Conservatives

In 1978 he announced that he had become a supporter of Margaret Thatcher, who had been his shadow counterpart when he was Minister of Transport, and intended to vote Conservative at the forthcoming general election, held in 1979. He was one of a group of ex-Labour politicians who defected to support the Conservatives in the 1979 election.

Peerage

Thatcher won the election, and she created him a life peer as Baron Marsh, of Mannington in the County of Wiltshire on 15 July 1981.  He then sat in the House of Lords as a Crossbench peer.

Personal

In 1950 Marsh married Evelyn Mary Andrews, with whom he had two sons. In 1973 they divorced.

In 1975 Marsh's second wife Caroline died in a road accident in Spain in which the wife of broadcaster David Jacobs also lost her life; Marsh and Jacobs both survived the crash.

He died in 2011 in London aged 83.

References 

Richard Marsh. "Off the Rails: An Autobiography".  Weidenfeld and Nicolson, London, 1978. .

External links 
 

{{succession box

1928 births
2011 deaths
20th-century British businesspeople
Alumni of the University of Greenwich
British Rail people
British business executives
Businesspeople from London
Marsh, Richard Marsh, Baron
Knights Bachelor
Labour Party (UK) MPs for English constituencies
Members of the Fabian Society
Marsh, Richard Marsh, Baron
Ministers in the Wilson governments, 1964–1970
Secretaries of State for Transport (UK)
UK MPs 1959–1964
UK MPs 1964–1966
UK MPs 1966–1970
UK MPs 1970–1974
20th-century English businesspeople
Life peers created by Elizabeth II